Nauru, following independence from the United Kingdom, became a sovereign, independent republic on 31 January 1968. Nauru has established diplomatic relations with a number of nations, including most of its Pacific neighbors with which it maintains economic, cultural and administrative ties.

Membership in international organizations

Nauru was admitted to the United Nations on 14 September 1999. Nauru's application to the United Nations was questioned by the People's Republic of China due to Nauru's close diplomatic and trade links to Taiwan. Nevertheless, Nauru was granted UN full membership.

Nauru became a full member of the Commonwealth of Nations in May 1999. Since independence, Nauru had been a special member of the Commonwealth prior to 1999, but having fallen behind in payments, reverted to Special Member status on 1 July 2005, with no authoritative power. It then returned to be a full member again in June 2011.

Additionally outside the region, Nauru is a member or participant of the ACP (Lomé Convention), the Alliance of Small Island States, the Asian Development Bank, the Economic and Social Commission for Asia and the Pacific (ESCAP), the Food and Agriculture Organization (FAO), the G-77, the International Civil Aviation Organization, the International Maritime Organization, the ITU, and the International Olympic Committee.

Nauru is notable for its lack of membership in several major international organizations. Nauru is one of only seven UN members that is not a member of the International Bank for Reconstruction and Development and one of 12 not part of the International Finance Corporation. Nauru also is not a member of the International Development Association and has no society associated with the International Red Cross and Red Crescent Movement. Finally, as with many other nations in Oceania, Nauru is not a member of the International Hydrographic Organization.

Membership in regional organizations

Regional cooperation through various multilateral organizations is a key element in Nauru's foreign policy. The country also hosted the regional meeting that resulted in the Nauru Agreement Concerning Cooperation in the Management of Fisheries of Common Interest whose eight signatories (including Nauru) collectively controls 25-30% of the world's tuna supply and approximately 60% of the western and central Pacific tuna supply. Additionally, Nauru is a full member of the Pacific Islands Forum, the South Pacific Applied Geoscience Commission, the Pacific Regional Environment Programme and the Secretariat of the Pacific Community.

Ties with the United States of America

Hosting refugees

In 2001 Nauru became host to approximately 867 refugees, mostly Afghan, who were intercepted while attempting to enter Australia illegally. This exchange was one of many which were collectively known as Australia's Pacific Solution. In February 2008, the last of the refugees were resettled in Australia. Nauru reportedly received about $10 million in assistance from Australia in exchange for agreeing to house the refugees while their asylum applications are adjudicated.

Bilateral relations

List of countries which Nauru maintains diplomatic relations with:

Bilateral relations

Other countries

Nauru has diplomatic relations with most states in Oceania. It also has ties with most major industrial countries, including Japan, the Republic of Korea, the Russian Federation, France, the UK, Germany, Spain, Canada, Australia, New Zealand, the United States of America and South Africa. Nauru has diplomatic relations with the European Union, most of its member states and a few other states in Europe, including the Holy See (Vatican City).

In 1995, Nauru broke off relations diplomatic relations with France to protest French nuclear testing in the Pacific. Relations were resumed in 1997.

Nauru established diplomatic relations with Kosovo on 23 April 2008, which ended 13 November 2019 as Nauru withdrew its recognition.

Nauru established diplomatic relations with Abkhazia and South Ossetia on 15 December 2009.

Relations with partially recognised states

Nauru has used its position as a member of the United Nations to gain financial support from both the Republic of China (ROC) and the People's Republic of China (PRC) by changing its position on the political status of Taiwan. During 2002, Nauru signed an agreement to establish diplomatic relations with the PRC on 21 July. Nauru accepted $130m from the PRC for this diplomatic move. In response, the ROC severed diplomatic relations with Nauru two days later. Nauru later re-established links with the ROC on 14 May 2005, and diplomatic ties with the PRC were officially severed on 31 May 2005. Similarly, Nauru recognized the Sahrawi Arab Democratic Republic on 12 August 1981. Then, on 15 September 2000, Nauru withdrew recognition of the SADR, and signed accords with Morocco on the phosphates area, which are running out in the island. In 2008, Nauru recognized Kosovo as an independent country, but withdrew its recognition in 2019. Additionally, in 2009, Nauru became only the fourth country to recognize the breakaway republics of Abkhazia and South Ossetia, which are both claimed by Georgia. Russia was reported to be giving Nauru $50m in humanitarian aid in return.

See also

 List of diplomatic missions in Nauru
 List of diplomatic missions of Nauru

Missions in Nauru

Australia (High Commission)
Republic of China (Embassy)

Nauru and the Commonwealth of Nations

Nauru has been an independent republic in the Commonwealth of Nations since 1968.

References

External links
Permanent Mission of the Republic of Nauru to the United Nations
Australian Department of Foreign Affairs & Trade pages on Nauru 
The U.S. Department of State's page on Nauru
History of Nauru - U.S. relations
Lithuanian government has just approved to establish diplomatic relations with Nauru, youtube.com

 
Nauru and the Commonwealth of Nations